These tables show pear production by country data from the Food and Agriculture Organization Corporate Statistical Database. The estimated total world production for pears in 2020 was 23,109,219 metric tonnes, down by 4.8% from 24,279,481 tonnes in 2019. China was by far the largest producer, accounting for more than twice the rest of the world combined (approximately 70%).

Latest data 

* indicates "Agriculture in COUNTRY or TERRITORY" links.

Past production 

* indicates "Agriculture in COUNTRY or TERRITORY" links.

Notes

References 

Pear production
Pears
Food and Agriculture Organization
Pears
Pears
Pears